Solona may refer to the following places:

Italy
 Solona (ancient city), an ancient town of Gallia Cispadana, probably in present Emilia-Romagna region

Ukraine
 Solona River (Bazavluk), a tributary of the Bazavluk River
 Solona River (Vovcha), a tributary of the Vovcha River

Romania
 Solona, a village in the commune Surduc, Sălaj County
 Solona (Someș), a tributary of the Someș in Sălaj County